The PrimeTime Players are a minor league professional basketball team based in Fort Mill, South Carolina. The PrimeTime Players have played independently in the Carolinas since 1991, competing in tournaments and pro-am leagues. The team has competed in The Basketball Tournament which is aired annually on ESPN networks against some of the best professionals in the world.

History 
PrimeTime Players are owned by Chris Thomas, who also serves as the team head coach.

After winning the first three Tobacco Road Basketball League championships (2012–14), PrimeTime are a founding member of the East Coast Basketball League. PTP have won ECBL titles in 2015, 2016, 2017, 2018, 2019 and 2021.

The Basketball Tournament 
Making their debut in 2015, PrimeTime traveled to Atlanta as the 19th seed. They won their debut against top-seeded Team DBD, 94–66. The next day, PrimeTime downed HBC, 66–59, to move on to the Super 17. Their run ended on July 24, losing to Dirty South, 76–75.

PrimeTime was the South Region nine seed in 2016, losing in the opening round to Trained To Go, 87–82.

For the 2017 tournament, PrimeTime were seeded tenth in the South Region. The team eliminated Blue Zoo (Middle Tennessee Blue Raiders alumni), 79–77, before falling in the second round to Ram Nation (VCU Rams alumni), 96–82.

In 2018, PrimeTime Players were the 12th seed in the Midwest Region. Their first round opponent, Always A Brave, were a collection of Bradley Braves alumni. PrimeTime advanced to the second round with a 68–64 victory. They defeated the four-seed Big X, 70–67, to earn a spot in the Super 16 in Atlanta where their journey ended, falling to the top-seeded Scarlet & Grey (Ohio State alumni), 72–60.

Seeded fourth in the 2019 Greensboro Regional, PrimeTime Players fell short in their first-round matchup against Florida TNT, 71–68.

In TBT 2020, PrimeTime was initially not included in the field of 24, reduced in size due to the COVID-19 pandemic. However, the No. 20 seed, Mid-American Unity, had one of their players test positive, although he was asymptomatic. That team withdrew from the tournament and was replaced by PrimeTime. PrimeTime faced team CP3, the No. 13 seed, in the opening round. PrimeTime led for most of the game, but ultimately were defeated, 76–74.

In TBT 2021, PrimeTime was seeded eighth in the West Virginia Regional. The team faced ninth-seeded Fort Wayne Champs and were defeated, 72–61.

Season-by-season records

References

External links
 Official website
 @PTPlayersECBL

Basketball teams in South Carolina
Rock Hill, South Carolina
Basketball teams established in 1991
1991 establishments in South Carolina
The Basketball Tournament teams